Francesca Inaudi (born 8 December 1977), is an Italian actress.

Life and career 
Born in Siena, at age eighteen Inaudi was selected by Giorgio Strehler to enroll in his acting courses at the Piccolo Teatro in Milan. After her graduation in 1999 and several years of work on stage, in 2004 Inaudi moved to Rome to pursue a film career, making her debut in Davide Ferrario's After Midnight. For her performance in this film she won a Grolla d'oro for best actress and earned a nomination to Nastro d'Argento in the same category. She later appeared in a large number of films and TV-series, receiving her second nomination to a Nastro d'Argento in 2007 for Paolo Virzì's Napoleon and Me.

Selected filmography
 After Midnight (2004) 
 The Beast in the Heart (2005)
 Don't Make Any Plans for Tonight (2006)
 Napoleon and Me (2007)
 A Question of the Heart (2009)
 Generation 1000 Euros (2009)
 Noi credevamo (2010)
 Marriage and Other Disasters (2010)
 Women vs. Men (2011)
 See You Tomorrow (2013)
 The Move of The Penguin (2013)

References

External links 
 
 

Italian film actresses
Italian television actresses
Italian stage actresses
21st-century Italian actresses
1977 births
People from Siena
Living people